"Peace" is Depeche Mode's second single from their 2009 studio album, Sounds of the Universe, their 47th UK single overall and the first not to be issued on 12" vinyl since "Dreaming of Me" in 1981.

Background
The record was released on 15 June 2009. Martin Gore told The Sun newspaper that he thought "Peace" is one of his favourite songs that he has ever written. He explained that both "Peace" and "Little Soul", "give the album a kind of thread. Both of those songs have a real spiritual feel, though we have to be really careful using that word." The song charted at #57 in the UK charts, equal to their first ever single, "Dreaming of Me" in 1981. This is the band's second lowest UK Singles Chart position after "Little 15", originally intended to be a France-only release which reached #60 upon limited UK release in 1988. In Germany, "Peace" reached #25.

The music video for "Peace" was filmed in Negoiești, Prahova, Romania by French duo Jonas & François, it features Romanian actress Maria Dinulescu and marks the first Depeche Mode video to not include any of the band members (because of Dave Gahan's illness), save for a promotional poster near the end.

Track listing
7": Mute / BONG 41

CD: Mute / CDBONG 41

CD: Mute / LCDBONG 41

Charts

References

External links
 Single information from the official Depeche Mode web site
 Allmusic review

2009 singles
Depeche Mode songs
Songs written by Martin Gore
2009 songs
Song recordings produced by Ben Hillier
Mute Records singles